Yellow Emanuelle (also released as Il mondo dei sensi di Emy Wong, Emanuelle Gialla, The Last Madame Butterfly) is a 1976 Italian film directed by Bitto Albertini, director of the prior Black Emanuelle.

Plot
In Hong Kong, a British airline pilot, George Taylor (Giuseppe Pambieri), is assaulted by a gang of thugs. He is taken to a hospital and nursed back to health by female Dr. Emy Wong (Chai Lee), a beautiful Chinese physician woman. As the pilot regains his health he becomes increasingly infatuated with female Dr. Wong and they embark upon a passionate love affair. The pilot however develops a terminal illness and dies in the arms of female Dr. Wong while they are making love. Overcome with grief she commits suicide, stabbing herself with a knife, before falling onto the body of George.

Cast
 Chai Lee as Dr. Emy Wong 
 Giuseppe Pambieri as George Taylor 
 Ilona Staller as Helen Miller / Helga 
 Claudio Giorgi  
 Rik Battaglia

References

External links

1976 films
Italian erotic drama films
1970s erotic films
Films directed by Bitto Albertini
Emanuelle
1970s Italian films
1970s French films